Brian Badza (born 23 June 1979) is a former Zimbabwean football striker.

He has been capped for the Zimbabwean national team. He was in the Zimbabwean squad for the 2006 African Cup of Nations.

He played domestically for Motor Action FC (2002) and CAPS United FC (2003–2005, 2006–2008) and in Belgium for K.F.C. Germinal Beerschot (2005–06).

References

1979 births
Living people
Zimbabwean footballers
Zimbabwean expatriate footballers
Beerschot A.C. players
CAPS United players
Expatriate footballers in Belgium
Zimbabwean expatriate sportspeople in Belgium
Zimbabwe international footballers
2006 Africa Cup of Nations players
Association football forwards